Charles Adolphe Albert Fauvel (1840, Caen -1921) was a French lawyer and amateur entomologist who specialised in Coleoptera. He described and named 1,851 species and 96 genera in Staphylinidae. He wrote nearly 250 papers in the Revue d’ Entomologie, a journal he founded, and a multi-volume work, Faune gallo-rhénane. For unknown reasons, he abruptly stopped publishing in 1910 and became a recluse for the rest of his life. His insect collections are held by the Royal Belgian Institute of Natural Sciences in Brussels, the Natural History Museum of Bern, Switzerland and the Museo Civico di Storia Naturale di Genova, Italy.

His zoological author abbreviation is Fauvel. For taxa he authored, see :Category:Taxa named by Charles Adolphe Albert Fauvel, and this query.

Notes

References
Anonymous (1921) [Fauvel, C. A. A.] The Entomologist's Monthly Magazine, Third Series, London. 57:161.
Constantin, R. (1992) Memorial des Coléopteristes Français. Bulletin de liaison de l'Association des Coléoptéristes de la région parisienne, Paris (Suppl. 14), S. 1-92, 2410, pp. 35
Wikispecies
Groll, E. K. (2017) Biographies of the Entomologists of the World – Online database, version 8, Senckenberg Deutsches Entomologisches Institut, Müncheberg – URL: sdei.senckenberg.de/biografies 

1840 births
1921 deaths
French entomologists
Coleopterists